Dobson's shrew tenrec (Nesogale dobsoni) is a species of mammal in the family Tenrecidae. It is endemic to Madagascar. Its natural habitats are subtropical or tropical moist forests, plantations, and heavily degraded former forest. On the basis of molecular data indicating that it and Talazac's shrew tenrec form a sister group to the rest of Microgale, these two species were transferred from Microgale to Nesogale in 2016.

References

Afrosoricida
Mammals of Madagascar
Mammals described in 1884
Taxa named by Oldfield Thomas
Taxonomy articles created by Polbot
Taxobox binomials not recognized by IUCN